For All the Saints: A Prayer Book for and by the Church is a breviary used in the Lutheran tradition. It is used daily to pray the canonical hours at fixed prayer times. It is bound in four volumes and follows the lectionary of the Lutheran Book of Worship. For All the Saints: A Prayer Book for and by the Church has prayers and readings from the Old Testament, Epistles and Gospels with a commentary on them. The breviary covers the entire Christian Bible in a two-year cycle.

See also 
The Brotherhood Prayer Book
Lutheran religious orders

References

External links 
For All the Saints Master Index - American Lutheran Publicity Bureau 

Canonical hours
Christian prayer
Lutheran liturgy and worship
Breviaries